Fenimorea abscondita is a species of sea snail, a marine gastropod mollusc in the family Drilliidae.

Description
The length of this marine shell varies between 20 mm and 36 mm.

Distribution
This marine species occurs off Florida, USA.

References

External links
  Fallon P.J. (2016). Taxonomic review of tropical western Atlantic shallow water Drilliidae (Mollusca: Gastropoda: Conoidea) including descriptions of 100 new species. Zootaxa. 4090(1): 1–363
 

abscondita
Gastropods described in 2016